The Panic of 1857 was a financial panic in the United States caused by the declining international economy and over-expansion of the domestic economy. Because of the invention of the telegraph by Samuel F. Morse in 1844, the Panic of 1857 was the first financial crisis to spread rapidly throughout the United States. The world economy was also more interconnected by the 1850s, which also made the Panic of 1857 the first worldwide economic crisis. In Britain, the Palmerston government circumvented the requirements of the Bank Charter Act 1844, which required gold and silver reserves to back up the amount of money in circulation. Surfacing news of this circumvention set off the Panic in Britain.

Beginning in September 1857, the financial downturn did not last long, but a proper recovery was not seen until the onset of the American Civil War in 1861. American banks did not recover until after the Civil War. After the failure of Ohio Life Insurance and Trust Company, the financial panic quickly spread as businesses began to fail, the railroad industry experienced financial declines, and hundreds of thousands of workers were laid off.

Because the years immediately preceding the Panic of 1857 were prosperous, many banks, merchants, and farmers had seized the opportunity to take risks with their investments, and, as soon as market prices began to fall, they quickly began to experience the effects of financial panic.

Background
The early 1850s saw great economic prosperity in the United States, stimulated by the large amount of gold mined in the California Gold Rush that greatly expanded the money supply. By the mid-1850s, the amount of gold mined began to decline, causing western bankers and investors to become wary. Eastern banks became cautious with their loans in the eastern US, and some even refused to accept paper currencies issued by western banks.

The US Supreme Court decided Dred Scott v. Sandford in March 1857. After the slave Dred Scott sued for his freedom, Chief Justice Roger Taney ruled that Scott was not a citizen because he was Black, and so did not have the right to sue in court. Taney also called the Missouri Compromise unconstitutional and said that the federal government could not prohibit slavery in US territories. The decision would clearly have a significant impact on the development of the western territories. Soon after the decision, "the political struggle between 'free soil' and slavery in the territories" began. The western territories north of the Missouri Compromise line were now opened to the expansion of slavery, which would obviously have drastic financial and political effects: "Kansas land warrants and western railroad securities' prices declined slightly just after the Dred Scott decision in early March." This fluctuation in railroad securities proved "that political news about future territories called the tune in the land and railroad securities markets".

Before 1857, the railroad industry had been booming due to large migrations of people to the west, especially to Kansas. The large influx of people made the railroads a profitable industry, and the banks began to provide railroad companies with large loans. Many of the companies never made it past the stage of a paper railroad and never owned the physical assets necessary to run a real one. Prices of railroad stocks as a whole began to experience a stock bubble, and railroad stocks saw increasingly-speculative entries into the fray, worsening the bubble. In the meantime, the Dred Scott decision lent uncertainty to railroads in general.

Stock market decline
In July 1857, railroad stock values peaked. On August 11, 1857, N. H. Wolfe and Company, the oldest flour and grain company in New York City, failed, shaking investor confidence and beginning a slow selling-off in the market that continued into late August.

Failure of Ohio Life Insurance and Trust Company
On the morning of August 24, 1857, the president of Ohio Life Insurance and Trust Company announced that its New York branch had suspended payments. The company, an Ohio-based bank with a second main office in New York City, had large mortgage holdings and was the liaison to other Ohio investment banks. Ohio Life went bankrupt because of fraudulent activities by the company's management, which threatened to precipitate the failure of other Ohio banks or, even worse, to create a run on the banks. According to an article printed in the New York Daily Times, Ohio Life's "New York City and Cincinnati [branches were] suspended; with liabilities, it is said, of $7,000,000". Fortunately, the banks connected to Ohio Life were reimbursed and "avoided suspending convertibility by credibly coinsuring one another against runs". The failure of Ohio Life brought attention to the financial state of the railroad industry and land markets and caused the financial panic to become more public.

Lasting effects
By the spring of 1858, "commercial credit had dried up, forcing already debt-ridden merchants of the West to curtail new purchases of inventory". The limited purchasing in the West led to merchants around the country seeing decreases in sales and profits. The railroads "had created an interdependent national economy, and now an economic downturn in the West threatened.... [an] economic crisis. Since many banks had financed railroads and land purchases, they began to feel the pressures of the falling value of railroad securities. The Illinois Central; Erie; Pittsburgh, Fort Wayne and Chicago; and Reading Railroad lines were all forced to shut down by the financial downturn. The Delaware, Lackawanna and Western Railroad and the Fond du Lac Railroad were forced to declare bankruptcy. The Boston and Worcester Railroad Company also experienced heavy financial difficulties. The employees were informed in a memo written in late October 1857 that "the receipts from Passengers and Freight have fallen off during [the] last month (as compared with the corresponding month of last year), over twenty thousand dollars, with very little prospect of any improvement during the coming winter." The company also announced that their workers would receive a "reduction in pay of ten percent". In addition to the decreasing value of railroad securities, farmers began to default on payments on their mortgaged lands in the West, which put even more financial pressure on banks.

The prices of grain also decreased significantly, and farmers experienced a loss in revenue, causing banks to foreclose on recently-purchased lands. Grain prices in 1855 had skyrocketed to $2.19 a bushel, and farmers began to purchase land to increase their crop supply, which, in turn, would increase their profits. However, by 1858, grain prices dropped severely to $0.80 a bushel. Many Midwestern towns felt the pressures of the Panic. For example, the town of Keokuk, Iowa, experienced financial strife from the economic downturns of the Panic:

A huge municipal debt magnified Keokuk's problems. By 1858 the town owed $900,000, mostly on railroad bonds, while the value of its taxable property dropped by $5.5 million. Lots that brought $1,000 before the crash now could not be sold for $10. Hard-hit property owners were unable to pay their taxes, and thousands of properties slipped into tax delinquency.

As a result of such a decrease of prices, land sales declined dramatically and westward expansion essentially halted until the Panic ended. Both merchants and farmers began to suffer for the investment risks that they had taken when the prices were high.

Remedies
By 1859, the Panic began to level off, and the economy had begun to stabilize. President James Buchanan announced that the paper-money system seemed to be the root cause of the Panic and then decided to withdraw the usage of all bank notes under twenty dollars. He also "advised the State banks to break away from the banks [and urged] them to follow the example of the Federal Government". He felt that would decrease the paper money supply to allow the specie supply time to increase and to reduce inflation rates. Buchanan wanted the state banks to follow the federal government, specifically the Independent Treasury system, which allowed the federal government to keep up with specie payments. That helped to alleviate some of the financial stress that had been brought on by the bank suspensions.

In his State of the Union message December 7, 1857, Buchanan said:

He also revealed the new strategy of "reform not relief" and expressed his feeling that "the government sympathized but could do nothing to alleviate the suffering individuals." To avoid further financial panics, Buchanan encouraged the US Congress to pass a law to provide the immediate forfeiture of a bank's charter if a bank suspended specie payments. Additionally, he asked state banks to keep one dollar in specie for every three issued as paper, and he discouraged the use of federal or state bonds as security on bank notes to avoid future inflation.

Results
The result of the Panic of 1857 was that the largely-agrarian southern economy, which had few railroads, suffered little, but the northern economy took a significant hit and made a slow recovery. The area affected the most by the Panic was the Great Lakes region, and the troubles of that region were "quickly passed to those enterprises in the East that depended upon western sales". After approximately a year, much of the economy in the North and the entire South had recovered from the Panic.

By the end of the Panic, in 1859, tensions between the North and South regarding the issue of slavery in the United States were increasing. The Panic of 1857 encouraged those in the South who believed the North needed the South to keep a stabilized economy, and southern threats of secession were temporarily quelled. Southerners believed that the Panic of 1857 made the North "more amenable to southern demands" and would help to keep slavery alive in the United States.

According to Kathryn Teresa Long, the religious revival of 1857–1858 led by Jeremiah Lanphier began among New York City businessmen in the early months of the Panic.

Crisis in the United Kingdom 
News of the crisis in America caused runs on the banks in Glasgow, Liverpool, and London. The Borough Bank of Liverpool closed its doors on October 27, 1857, and the Western Bank of Scotland failed on November 9 as did the City of Glasgow Bank two days later. The government was forced to suspend the Bank Charter Act of 1844 again on November 12. The bullion in the Bank of England started increasing soon after, but unlike the Panic of 1847, the suspension was required this time for the British currency to remain legal and convertible under the Bank Charter Act 1844. The fiduciary issue was temporarily increased to the extent of £2 million and was used between November 18 and December 23, 1857.<ref>

See also

 Black Friday (1869)—Also referred to as the Gold Panic of 1869
 Financial crisis
 Panic of 1873
 Panic of 1893
 New England Shoemakers Strike of 1860

Notes

Bibliography
 
 Glasner, David, ed. Business Cycles and Depressions: An Encyclopedia 1997.
 
 
 
Klein, Philip Shriver. President James Buchanan (Pennsylvania State University Press, 1962).

 
 Long, Kathryn Teresa. The Revival of 1857–58: Interpreting an American Religious Awakening Oxford University Press, 1998 online edition
 
 Rezneck, Samuel. Business Depressions and Financial Panics (Greenwood 1968).
 Ross, Michael A. Justice of Shattered Dreams: Samuel Freeman Miller and the Supreme Court During the Civil War Era . Baton Rouge: Louisiana State University Press, 2003.
 
 
 
 
 Van Vleck, George W. The Panic of 1857, an Analytical Study (New York: Columbia University Press, 1943)

Contemporary newspaper 
 "Commercial Affairs" New York Daily Times, August 28, 1857
 "A New Tariff" New York Daily Times, February 4, 1857

External links

 
 
 Dickinson College. "House Divided." Accessed October 30, 2010
 Visit to Dred Scott, 1857, Library of Congress

Banking in the United States
Economic crises in the United States
Financial crises
19th-century economic history
Presidency of James Buchanan
1857 in the United States
1857 in economics